Sri Aurobindo College (Evening) is a co-ed constituent college of the University of Delhi in New Delhi, India. The college is situated on Basant Kaur Marg and is well connected by Delhi's public bus transport system. It is a two-minute walk from the Malviya Nagar Metro station. Various societies in the college have year-round activities carried out by the students. The college organizes academic activities that include lectures, talks, seminars, workshops, and presentations on a regular basis.

Notable Alumni - Harsh Beniwal 

Neeraj Pandey (Director)

Departments
The college currently has following departments:

Music
History
English
Hindi
Economics
Applied Psychology
Political Science
Commerce
Physical Education
Sanskrit

Cultural fest 
The annual fest of Sri Aurobindo College Evening is Exuberance (Sargam), and is an inter-college festival. Exuberance acts as a choir of various musical events, ranging from sufi to pop and rock-n-roll. Other events include literary events and fashion shows. The festival has seen massive participation by students.

Admissions process 
The college acts in accordance to the Delhi University Centralized Admission Procedure. Admission to a course of study is based on a cut-off percentage announced through the university in June every year. Prospective students should have completed 12 years of study and must have scored equivalent to, or more than, the given cut-off percentage in previous qualifying examination.

See also
Education in India
Literacy in India
List of institutions of higher education in Delhi

References

External links 
Official website
Aurobindo College, Delhi

Universities and colleges in Delhi
Educational institutions established in 1984
1984 establishments in Delhi